Richard Walter (born 8 April 1959) is a former Australian rules footballer who played with Hawthorn in the VFL during the late 1970s.

Walter was recruited by Hawthorn from North Kew and made his VFL debut in 1977. The following season he played as a forward pocket in their premiership team.

References

1959 births
Living people
Hawthorn Football Club players
Hawthorn Football Club Premiership players
Australian rules footballers from Victoria (Australia)
One-time VFL/AFL Premiership players